The Herzliya Conference is an annual summit held at the Interdisciplinary Center in Herzliya, Israel to discuss matters of state security and policy.

History
The Herzliya Conference was established in December 2000 as a "closed-door annual gathering of the country's very top political, security, intelligence, and business elite". Its declared aim was “taking stock of Israel’s national security across a wide range of dimensions: the military balance, international diplomatic environment, economic health, social fabric, quality of education, government performance, and the Jewish world.”

The Institute for Policy and Strategy (IPS), headed by Alex Mintz of the Lauder School of Government, Diplomacy and Strategy  sponsors the Herzliya Conference. The institute studies  national policy with the aim of upgrading of the strategic decision-making process through policy-driven research and interaction between policy analysts and policy-makers. The institute is considered a world leader in risk assessment in the Middle East.

The European Leadership Network (ELNET) and the Forum of Strategic Dialogue (FSD) regularly host special roundtable sessions at the Herzliya Conference.

Notable addresses

Ariel Sharon
Prime Minister Ariel Sharon delivered his most important foreign policy speeches at the Herzliya Conferences. His addresses at this forum were likened to the U.S. president's State of the Union address. 
At the third Herzliya Conference, Sharon announced his support for the Road map for peace and at the Fourth Herzliya Conference, he presented for the first time his unilateral disengagement plan.

Ehud Olmert
On January 24, 2006, Ehud Olmert, in his first major policy address since becoming Israel's acting prime minister, said at the Herzliya Conference that he backed the creation of a Palestinian state, and that Israel would have to relinquish parts of the West Bank to maintain Israel's Jewish majority.

References

External links
 Herzliya Conference Official Website
 Yonatan Mendel at the Herzliya Conference, London Review of Books, 22.4.2007

Zionism
Israeli–Palestinian peace process
Reichman University
Herzliya
Recurring events established in 2000
2000 establishments in Israel